BNR/Asp-box repeat is a repetitive sequence of amino acids contained in some proteins.

Members of this family contain multiple BNR (bacterial neuraminidase repeat) repeats or Asp-boxes. The repeats are short, however the repeats are never found closer than 40 residues together suggesting that the repeat is structurally longer. These repeats are found in a variety of non-homologous proteins, including bacterial ribonucleases, sulphite oxidases, reelin, netrins, sialidases, neuraminidases, some lipoprotein receptors, and a variety of glycosyl hydrolases.

Members of this family contain multiple BNR (bacterial neuraminidase repeat) repeats or Asp-boxes.

Examples 

Human genes encoding proteins containing this domain include:
 NEU1
 NEU2
 NEU3
 RELN
 SORCS1
 SORCS2
 SORCS3
 SORL1
 SORT1

References 

Protein structural motifs